Claudia Hufnagl (born 20 May 1996) is an Austrian swimmer. She competed in the women's 200 metre butterfly event at the 2018 FINA World Swimming Championships (25 m), in Hangzhou, China.

References

External links
 

1996 births
Living people
Austrian female butterfly swimmers
Place of birth missing (living people)